The 2005 Queensland Cup season was the 10th season of Queensland's top-level statewide rugby league competition run by the Queensland Rugby League. The competition, known as the Queensland Wizard Cup due to sponsorship from Wizard Home Loans featured 11 teams playing a 26-week long season (including finals) from March to September.

The North Queensland Cowboys finished as minor premiers and defeated the Burleigh Bears 36–6 in the Grand Final at Suncorp Stadium to claim their first premiership. Norths Devils  Greg Inglis was named the competition's Player of the Year, winning the Courier Mail Medal.

Teams 
Brothers-Valleys, who joined the competition in 2004, withdrew after just one season and were not replaced, with the competition featuring 11 teams for the first time since 2001.

The Brisbane Broncos, Melbourne Storm and North Queensland Cowboys were again affiliated with the Toowoomba Clydesdales, Norths Devils and North Queensland Young Guns respectively.

Ladder

Finals series 

† Match decided in extra time.

Grand Final 

North Queensland took out the minor premiership and qualified for the finals for the first time since joining the Queensland Cup in 2002, losing just three games in the regular season. In the finals, they defeated Burleigh in the major semi final to book a spot in their first Grand Final. Defending premiers Burleigh, who finished the season in 3rd, defeated Norths in the Week 1 qualifying final to set up a contest with the Young Guns. After losing, the Bears hosted Redcliffe, defeating them 24–19 and qualifying for their third straight Grand Final.

First half 
The Young Guns opened the scoring in the 8th minute, when Neil Sweeney kicked a penalty goal after prop Jaiman Lowe was taken high by Bears' second rower Adam Hutchison. Seven minutes later, North Queensland recorded the first try of the game when centre David Myles sliced through some soft defence to score. They extended their lead to 12–0 when five-eighth Shane Muspratt burrowed over from dummy half to score. In the 28th minute, Burleigh finally got on the board thanks to a long range try to former North Queensland Cowboy Trent Leis. Two minutes before half time, the Young Guns extended their lead to 12 when Neil Sweeney scored under the posts thanks to a Brent McConnell line break.

Second half 
The second half was scoreless until the final 10 minutes, when the Young Guns ran in three unanswered tries on their way to their first premiership. In the 70th minute, hooker Clint Amos dived over from dummy half, pushing the lead to 18. From the set following the kick off, captain Daniel Strickland burst through the Bears' defensive line and sent fullback Jason Barsley away to score under the posts. Finally, in the 76th minute, a McConnell chip kick was regathered by Muspratt, who kept it alive, with the ball going through five sets of hands before Myles finished the play for his second try. The win marked the first time a team from outside of south east Queensland would win the Grand Final.

Three players from the victorious Young Guns' side, Gavin Cooper, Matthew Scott and Scott Bolton, would go on to become club legends for the North Queensland Cowboys, with all three winning an NRL premiership with the club in 2015.

Player statistics

Leading try scorers

Leading point scorers

End-of-season awards 
 Courier Mail Medal: Greg Inglis ( Norths Devils)
 Coach of the Year: Wayne Treleaven ( Norths Devils)
 Rookie of the Year: Wayne Bond ( Redcliffe Dolphins)
 Representative Player of the Year: Nathan Friend ( Queensland Residents,  Norths Devils)

See also 

 Queensland Cup
 Queensland Rugby League

References 

2005 in Australian rugby league
Queensland Cup